Mathew was a racehorse which won the 1847 Grand National Steeplechase at Aintree near Liverpool. He is regarded as the first Irish-trained horse to win the race having been prepared for the race by John Murphy at The Curragh for County Cork-based owner John Courtenay. He was ridden on the day by the Irish jockey, Denny Wynne.

References

1838 racehorse births
Racehorses bred in Ireland
Racehorses trained in Ireland
Non-Thoroughbred racehorses
Steeplechase racehorses
Grand National winners